Randel Shakison (born 28 February 1990 in Amsterdam, Netherlands) is a Dutch footballer who currently plays for AFC in the Dutch Topklasse. Shakison made his Eerste Divisie league debut at Fortuna Sittard during the 2010–2011 season.

References

Dutch footballers
Footballers from Amsterdam
Fortuna Sittard players
FC Emmen players
Eerste Divisie players
Derde Divisie players
1990 births
Living people
Amsterdamsche FC players
Association football fullbacks